Sorel Jacinthe is a senator in Haiti. A former ally of Haiti's president, Jovenel Moise, in 2019 he was part of the opposition calling for his resignation.

References

Members of the Senate (Haiti)
21st-century Haitian politicians
Year of birth missing (living people)
Living people